The Chugach Mountains of southern Alaska are the northernmost of the several mountain ranges that make up the Pacific Coast Ranges of the western edge of North America. It is bounded on the north by the Matanuska, Copper, and Chitina rivers. Even so, its position along the Gulf of Alaska ensures more snowfall in the Chugach than anywhere else in the world, an annual average of over 1500 cm (800 in).

The mountains are protected in the Chugach State Park and the Chugach National Forest. Near to Anchorage, they are a popular destination for outdoor activities.

The Richardson Highway, Seward Highway, Portage Glacier Highway, and the Glenn Highway run through the Chugach Mountains. The Anton Anderson Memorial Tunnel of the Portage Glacier Highway provides railroad and automobile access underneath Maynard Mountain between Portage Lake and the city of Whittier on Prince William Sound.

On Mount Gordon Lyon, at about the  level, is a  five-pointed star using around 350 light globes. This faces Anchorage to be visible from the city at night. It is illuminated to commemorate Christmas, being lit from Thanksgiving until Christmas Day; and, on 9/11. Maintenance is undertaken by the US Air Force’s Joint Base Elmendorf-Richardson, although it was established in around 1960 and formerly maintained by the US Army having been near the former Army (Nike missile Site Summit) in the mountains.

History
The name "Chugach" comes from Chugach Sugpiaq "Cuungaaciiq," Alaska Natives inhabiting the Kenai Peninsula and Prince William Sound on the south coast of Alaska. The Chugach people are an Alutiiq (Pacific Eskimo) people who speak the Chugach dialect of the Alutiiq language. In 1898 United States Army Captain William R. Abercrombie spelled the name "Chugatch" and applied it to the mountains. It is possible that the Koniagmiut (Sugpiat or Alutiit of the Kodiak Archipelago and the Alaska Peninsula) may also have called these northern Sugpiat "Cuungaaciirmiut" in ancient times but it is also possible that this was a neologism during Russian times.

Mountains
The twelve highest peaks in the Chugach Mountains are listed below:

Other important peaks in the Chugach Mountains include:
 Mount Michelson 
 Bashful Peak 
 Mount Billy Mitchell 
 Mount Palmer 
 Eagle Peak 
 Polar Bear Peak 
 Mount Williwaw 
 The Ramp 
 North Suicide Peak 
 Ptarmigan Peak 
 Byron Peak 
 Flattop Mountain 
 Bold Peak

Gallery

See also
 Matanuska Formation

References

External links

Landforms of Chugach Census Area, Alaska
Landforms of Copper River Census Area, Alaska
Mountain ranges of Alaska
Mountains of Anchorage, Alaska
Mountains of Matanuska-Susitna Borough, Alaska
Mountains of Unorganized Borough, Alaska